Theudas (died c. 46 AD) was a Jewish rebel of the 1st century AD. Scholars attribute to his name a Greek etymology possibly meant as "flowing with water", although with a Hellenist-styled ending. At some point between 44 and 46 AD, Theudas led his followers in a short-lived revolt.

The revolt

The principal source for the story of Theudas' revolt is Josephus, who wrote:

It came to pass, while Cuspius Fadus was procurator of Judea, that a certain charlatan, whose name was Theudas, persuaded a great part of the people to take their effects with them, and follow him to the Jordan river; for he told them he was a prophet, and that he would, by his own command, divide the river, and afford them an easy passage over it. Many were deluded by his words. However, Fadus did not permit them to make any advantage of his wild attempt, but sent a troop of horsemen out against them. After falling upon them unexpectedly, they slew many of them, and took many of them alive. They also took Theudas alive, cut off his head, and carried it to Jerusalem. (Jewish Antiquities 20.97-98)

The movement was dispersed, and was never heard of again.

Josephus does not provide a number for Theudas's followers, but Acts 5:36, if it is referring to the same Theudas (see below), reports that they numbered about 400.

The Theudas problem

The sole reference to Theudas presents a problem of chronology if one assumes the Acts of the Apostles and Josephus are speaking of the same person and Josephus is correct. In Acts, Gamaliel, a member of the Sanhedrin, defends the apostles by referring to Theudas:

The difficulty is that Gamaliel, speaking before the year 37, is described as referring to the rising of Theudas, linking it to the revolt of Judas of Galilee at the time of the Census of Quirinius decades before, in 6 CE. However, Josephus makes clear that the revolt of Theudas took place around 45, which is after Gamaliel is said to have spoken, and long after the time of Judas the Galilean.

It has been proposed that the writer of Acts used Josephus as a source, and made a mistake in reading the text, taking a later reference to the execution of the "sons of Judas the Galilean" after the rebellion of Theudas as saying that the rebellion of Judas was later; however it is a minority view, since most scholars agree that Luke and Josephus used separate, independent sources. It has also been suggested that the reference in Acts is to a different revolt by another, unknown Theudas, because Josephus states that there were numerous uprisings, saying there were "ten thousand disorders", but he gives details on only four and Theudas was not a unique name. According to ancient historian and New Testament scholar Paul Barnett "It seems unlikely that Luke would have made an error about an infamous contemporary". It is also possible that Josephus himself made a mistake, the Pulpit Commentary states: "Josephus may have misplaced the adventure of Theudas by some accidental error. Considering the vast number of Jewish insurrections from the death of Herod the Great to the destruction of Jerusalem, such a mistake is not very improbable."

See also
List of people who were beheaded

References

Sources 
 Flavius Josephus, Jewish Antiquities 20.97-98
 Acts of the Apostles 5:36

External links 
 A response to the Theudas problem
 Jewish Encyclopedia: Theudas

1st-century Jews
1st-century executions
Year of birth unknown
46 deaths
Executed revolutionaries
Jewish messiah claimants
People executed by decapitation
People executed by the Roman Empire
People in Acts of the Apostles
Census of Quirinius